Frank Sullivan Logue (born 1963) is the eleventh bishop of the Episcopal Diocese of Georgia in the United States. He was elected November 16, 2019 to succeed Scott A. Benhase.

Early life and career
Born in Montgomery, Alabama, he is a graduate of Georgia Southern University and Virginia Theological Seminary. In 1988, he hiked the Appalachian Trail with his wife, Victoria, and the two wrote The Appalachian Trail Hiker and then six other travel books.

Ministry
He served as the church planter for King of Peace Episcopal Church in Kingsland, Georgia. He was elected on November 16, 2019, on the first ballot. Logue was serving as Canon to the Ordinary of the Diocese of Georgia and a member of the Executive Council of the Episcopal Church when elected. Logue succeeded Scott Anson Benhase on May 30, 2020, when he was consecrated as a bishop in Christ Church in Savannah, Georgia. Because of COVID-19 precautions, his ordination was conducted with a minimal number of people in attendance and was broadcast via livestream on the Internet.

See also

 List of Episcopal bishops of the United States
 Historical list of the Episcopal bishops of the United States

External links
 Biography on Diocesan Website

References

Living people
1963 births
Georgia State University alumni
People from Montgomery, Alabama
Virginia Theological Seminary alumni
People from Kingsland, Georgia
People from Savannah, Georgia
Episcopal bishops of Georgia